Winogradskyella multivorans is a Gram-negative, aerobic, rod-shaped and motile bacterium from the genus of Winogradskyella which has been isolated from seawater from a oyster farm in Korea. Winogradskyella multivorans has the ability to degrade polysaccharides.

References

Flavobacteria
Bacteria described in 2012